Harry Dwight Sisson  (January 9, 1863 – November 4, 1938) was an American   businessman and politician who served as a  mayor of Pittsfield, Massachusetts.

His parents were Henry Dwight Sisson (1836-1914) and Emilie Persis Spaulding (1836-1923).

He was a member of the Sons of Veterans.  In 1919 he was elected to a one year term as national commander-in-chief of the organization.

He is buried in the Pittsfield Cemetery in Pittsfield, Massachusetts.

See also
 Massachusetts legislature: 1929–1930, 1931–1932, 1933–1934, 1935–1936, 1937–1938

Notes

1863 births
1938 deaths
Mayors of Pittsfield, Massachusetts
Members of the Massachusetts House of Representatives